Vahidieh (also Romanized as Vaḥīdīeh) is a city in the Central District of Shahriar County, Tehran province, Iran. At the 2006 census, its population was 24,871 in 6,131 households. The following census in 2011 counted 22,405 people in 7,671 households. The latest census in 2016 showed a population of 33,249 people in 9,600 households.

References 

Shahriar County

Cities in Tehran Province

Populated places in Tehran Province

Populated places in Shahriar County